Parapamea is a genus of moths of the family Noctuidae.

Species
 Parapamea buffaloensis (Grote, 1877)

References
Natural History Museum Lepidoptera genus database
Parapamea at funet

Hadeninae